André Andrade is a Paralympic athlete from Brazil competing mainly in category T13 sprints events.

André has competed in the sprint events at three consecutive Paralympics in 2000 he competed in the 400m and won silvers in both the 100m and 200m.  In the 2004 Summer Paralympics he was part of the unsuccessful Brazilian T11-13 4 × 100 m relay team but did improve to gold in the T13 100m and silver in the 200m.  He again competed in the 100m, 200m and 4 × 100 m in 2008 but this time failed to win any medals.

References

External links
 
 Andre Andrade of Brazil celebrates winning the Gold medal in the Men's 200m T13 final during the Athens 2004 Paralympic Games

Year of birth missing (living people)
Living people
Brazilian male sprinters
Paralympic athletes of Brazil
Paralympic gold medalists for Brazil
Paralympic silver medalists for Brazil
Paralympic medalists in athletics (track and field)
Athletes (track and field) at the 2000 Summer Paralympics
Athletes (track and field) at the 2004 Summer Paralympics
Athletes (track and field) at the 2008 Summer Paralympics
Medalists at the 2000 Summer Paralympics
Medalists at the 2004 Summer Paralympics
Medalists at the 2007 Parapan American Games
Medalists at the 2011 Parapan American Games
Sportspeople from Porto Alegre
20th-century Brazilian people
21st-century Brazilian people
Visually impaired sprinters
Paralympic sprinters